Nemmers Prize may refer to:

Nemmers Prize in Mathematics
Nemmers Prize in Economics
Nemmers Prize in Music Composition
Nemmers Prize in Medical Science
Nemmers Prize in Earth Sciences